Qari Ahmadullah (born 1975) was an Afghan politician and the Taliban's first interior minister in 1996.

He was responsible for bribing anti-Taliban commanders to desert the ranks of the United Islamic Front for the Salvation of Afghanistan opposition. Ahmadullah also commanded troops fighting on frontlines in the north of the country against the Northern Alliance.

Background
According to the Official Journal of the European Union and the testimony of Abdul Haq Wasiq, before his Combatant Status Review Tribunal, Ahmadullah was the Minister of Security and also Minister of Intelligence and Governor of Takhar Province. Abdul Haq described Ahmadullah as an uneducated man.

He was supposedly killed in the opening days of 2002 in the American airstrike against Mullah Taha's house in Zadran (though the Pentagon was unable to confirm Ahmadullah's death). 12 years after the incident, an investigation by Harper's Weekly alleged Ahmadullah is alive.

See also
 List of people who disappeared

References

1975 births
2000s missing person cases
Governors of Takhar Province
Missing people
Missing person cases in Afghanistan
Taliban government ministers of Afghanistan
Pashtun people